C. Davida Ingram is a conceptual artist specializing in gender, race and social practice. Her art explores desire, space, time and memory, while questioning 21st century black female subjectivity. She is also a public speaker and civic leader. She received the 2014 Stranger Genius Award in Visual Arts. In 2016 she was a Kennedy Center Citizen Art Fellow, a finalist for the 2016 Neddy Arts Award, and 2018 Jacob Lawrence Fellow. Ingram, along with Prometheus Brown of Blue Scholars, and Tony-nominated choreographer and director, Donald Byrd at the 2016 Crosscut Arts Salon: The Color of Race. In 2017 she was featured in Seattle Magazine's Most Influential Seattleites of 2017. In the same year she received the Mona Marita Dingus Award for Innovative Media.

She was engaged in the fight against institutional racism in the Seattle Art Museum library where she was head of Civic Engagement Programs.

Her work has been exhibited widely, including at Frye Art Museum, the Northwest African American Museum, the Intiman Theatre, Bridge Productions, WaNaWari, Tacoma Art Museum, and the Jacob Lawrence Gallery at the University of Washington.

Davida's interest in art began when her father taught her how to draw a face.

Her work has a post-modern sensibility because she is particularly influenced by theory and cultural studies.

References

Living people
Year of birth missing (living people)
21st-century American artists